The Securities Times (abbreviated as ST; 证券时报; 證券時報) is a national financial newspaper in China, with headquarters in Shenzhen. It is a China's state-owned newspaper,  and was launched on November 27, 1993. The newspaper is supervised and organized by the People's Daily Agency.

Securities Times is one of the four major securities newspapers in China, the other three being China Securities Journal, Shanghai Securities Journal and Securities Daily.

References

Newspapers published in China
Publications established in 1993
1993 establishments in China